In Nonnus's fifth-century AD epic poem Dionysiaca, Pyrrhus is a minor figure who was punished by the goddess Rhea. His short story is only mentioned in passing.

Mythology 
The little-known and otherwise unattested Pyrrhus was a Phrygian mortal man who lusted after the goddess Rhea, mother of the gods, and tried to assault her. Rhea changed him into a stone immediately for his hubris. This happened not far from the site of Niobe's own transformation into a rock after she challenged Leto.

See also 

 Antigone of Troy
 Astynome
 Ixion
 Olenus

References

Bibliography 
 
 Nonnus, Dionysiaca; translated by Rouse, W H D, I Books I-XV. Loeb Classical Library No. 344, Cambridge, Massachusetts, Harvard University Press; London, William Heinemann Ltd. 1940. Internet Archive

Rhea (mythology)
Metamorphoses into inanimate objects in Greek mythology
Anatolian characters in Greek mythology
Mythological rapists